Russell Savakus (May 13, 1925 – June 26, 1984) was an American session bass player (both electric and stand-up), violinist and singer. Savakus recorded with numerous artists in and around the 1960s folk and folk-rock movement in New York. Earlier, he had been a part of the rhythm section for the Les Elgart swing band.

According to Michael Bloomfield, who met Savakus at a Bob Dylan session: "They had a bass player, a terrific guy, Russ Savakus. It was his first day playing electric bass, and he was scared of that. No one understood nothing." However, Dylan chose to replace Savakus on tour

Discography
Songs and records that he has played on include:
 Embraceable You, Chet Baker (1957)
 Walk On By, Dionne Warwick (1964)
 Farewell, Angelina, Joan Baez (1965)
 The In Instrumentals, Kai Winding (Verve, 1965)
 Reflections in a Crystal Wind, Richard & Mimi Fariña (1965)
 Highway 61 Revisited, Bob Dylan (1965)
 Early Morning Rain, Ian and Sylvia (1965)
 Many a Mile, Buffy Saint-Marie (1965)
 Southbound, Doc Watson (1966)
 I'm a Believer, The Monkees (1966)
 Fire & Fleet & Candlelight, Buffy Saint-Marie (1967)
 Brown Eyed Girl, Van Morrison (1967)
 Memories, Richard & Mimi Fariña (1968)
 The Corporation: Vinnie Bell, Dick Hyman, Bill LaVorgna, Phil Bodner, Bucky Pizzarelli, Russ Savakus (1968)
 Rhymes and Reasons, John Denver (1969)
 Take Me to Tomorrow, John Denver (1970)
 David Clayton-Thomas, David Clayton-Thomas (1972)
 Don McLean, Don McLean (1972)
 Extension of a Man, Donny Hathaway (1973)
 Playin' Favorites, Don McLean (1973)
 Never Letting Go, Phoebe Snow (1977)
 Times of Our Lives, Judy Collins (1982)

References

1925 births
1984 deaths
American rock bass guitarists
American male bass guitarists
American session musicians
American double-bassists
Male double-bassists
American male singers
American male violinists
21st-century double-bassists
21st-century American violinists
21st-century American male musicians
Juilliard School alumni
Columbia University alumni